Chaher Zarour (born March 14, 1983) is a French-Algerian footballer who plays as a centre-back.

Club career

Dijon
On September 16, 2009, Zarour signed a 3-year contract with Ligue 2 side Dijon. Two days later he made his debut for the club coming on as a substitute in a league game against FC Metz. On October 2, 2009, Zarour scored his first goal for the club in a league game against Le Havre AC.

Arles-Avignon
In July 2012, Zarour joined Ligue 2 side Arles-Avignon on a two-year contract.

Sanna Khánh Hòa BVN
In January 2016, Zarour joined V-League side Sanna Khánh Hòa BVN on a one-year contract.

References

1983 births
Living people
Sportspeople from Montreuil, Seine-Saint-Denis
French sportspeople of Algerian descent
Algerian footballers
French footballers
Paris FC players
AS Cannes players
Dijon FCO players
AC Arlésien players
FCM Aubervilliers players
AC Amiens players
Khanh Hoa FC players
Villemomble Sports players
Ligue 1 players
Ligue 2 players
V.League 1 players
Championnat National players
French expatriate footballers
French expatriate sportspeople in Vietnam
Expatriate footballers in Vietnam
Association football defenders
Footballers from Seine-Saint-Denis